Korthals may refer to:

Things
The dog, the Korthals Griffon, known as the Wirehaired Pointing Griffon

People
 Benk Korthals (b. 1944), a Dutch politician
 Pieter Willem Korthals (1807-1892), a Dutch botanist in the Dutch East Indies
 Hendrik Albertus Korthals (1911-1976), a liberal Dutch politician
 Eduard Karel Korthals (1851-1896), Dutch dog breeder
 Robert W. Korthals, Canadian banker, president Toronto-Dominion Bank